Kelly Lee Owens is the debut studio album by Welsh electronic musician Kelly Lee Owens. It was released on 24 March 2017, by Smalltown Supersound.

Critical reception

Kelly Lee Owens was well received by critics.  Philip Sherburne of Pitchfork reviewed "Kelly Lee Owens is a message in a bottle that’s come bobbing back from somewhere in the future." Stephen Carlick of Exclaim! said "These are layered, atmospheric tracks that blend minimal techno, dream-pop, Krautrock and ambient drone into a dazzling, alchemical whole that defies easy categorization."

Track listing
All tracks written by Kelly Lee Owens.

References

2017 debut albums
Kelly Lee Owens albums
Smalltown Supersound albums
Drone music albums by Welsh artists
Krautrock albums
Minimal techno albums